The Dark Tales is a series of Hong Kong television period supernatural dramas that originally aired on Jade from 18 March 1996 to 1 May 1998, consisting of two installments with 75 episodes. Based on Qing Dynasty writer Pu Songling's series of supernatural tales called Strange Stories from a Chinese Studio, Dark Tales is produced by TVB and stars a cast of mainly Hong Kong and Taiwanese actors.

Dark Tales I
Dark Tales I (聊齋) originally aired on Jade every weekday evening from 18 March to 5 May 1996, and is produced by Lau Sze-yu and Chou Ling-kang, consisting of 35 episodes. It features six independent stories, adapted from the first ten books of Pu's novel.

Part I (Episodes 1–5)
Part I (流光情劫; lit. "Stealing Love Through Time") is adapted from the tale Mr. Lu's Daughter (魯公女).

Jamie Weng as Chang Yu-dan (張於旦)
Cynthia Khan as Lu Chin-tsai / Lu Han-chu (魯金采／盧含珠)
Chao Chung as You Feng-wen (游鳳紋)
Gary Chan as Crown Prince (鹿王三太子)
Jessie Chan as Siao Chui (小翠)
Hsieh Han as Master Hui-tong (慧通大師)
Chen Hung-lieh as Uncle Shen (沈叔)
Suen Kwai-hing as Tien Tor Chi
Chan Chung-gin as Emperor Crown (鹿王)
Suen Dalong as Young Chang Yu-dan (十八歲張於旦)
Kwok Tak-shun as Governor (戶部)
Lily Liew as Governor's wife (戶部夫人)
Cho Chai as Lu An (盧安)
Wong Te-fen as Hong Er (紅兒)
Shi Yun as Magistrate (縣令)
Howie Huang as General (少將軍)
Yip Jan-wa as Ming (阿明)
Yip Yung as Cheng (阿政)

Part II (Episodes 6–10)
Part II (俠女田郎; lit. Heroine Tian) is adapted from the tale Tian Chi-lang (田七郎).

Cheung Siu-fai as Wu Cheng-hsiu (武承休)
Chin Siu-ho as Tian Chi-lang (田七郎)
Cynthia Khan as Liu Mu-lian (劉木蓮)
Josephine Lam as Wu Cheng-hsiu's wife (武承休夫人)
Chao Chung as Su Yue (素月)
Michelle Fung as Cheng Chu (程菊)
Wilson Tsui as Li Ying (李應)
Joseph Lee as Lin Er (林二)
Wong Siu-lung as Siao Wu (小五)
Leung Yuk-gan as Su Su (蘇蘇)
Sally Chen as Tian's Mother (田母)
Chen Hung-lieh as Yan Tao-sheng (嚴道生)
Derek Kok as Yan Hou (嚴候)
Hui Man-chuen as Yan Yung (嚴用)
Chan Wing-chun as Wei Ming (魏明)
Jack Wong as the Emperor (皇帝)
Ho Bik-kin as Manager Wang (王掌櫃)
Sun Dalong as Chiang Chiu (蔣九)
Shiu Cheuk-hiu as Bali (巴利)
Yip Yung as Balu (巴魯)
Tie Meng-qiu as Eunuch Yu

Part III (Episodes 11–15)
Part III (古劍幽靈; lit. "Ancient Ghost Sword") is adapted from the tale Chin Sheng-se (金生色).

Jamie Weng as Chin Sheng-se (金生色)
Chiang Shu-na as Siao Wen (小雯)
Elizabeth Lee as Mu Yue-chin (木月琴)
Derek Kok as Mu Ma-biao (木麻彪)
Alice Fung as Mrs. Mu (木夫人)
Tam Yat-ching as Mu Ying-hao (木英豪)
Kwong Wing-fai as Mu Hsing (木興)
Yip Yung as Mu Long (木隆)
Joseph Lee as Tung Kwai (董貴)
Cheng Zhuan as Tung Wu (董五)
Hsieh Han as Tung Bi-cheng (董必成)
Kwan Yi as Grandma Chin (金姥姥)
Wilson Tsui as Chin Sheng-kwang (金生光)
Lily Lieu as Mother Bo (鴇母)
Chan Pui-shan as Tao Hung (桃紅)
Ho Sam as Prostitute
Chan Heung-ying as Prostitute
Chan Wing-chun as Wang Hsiung (王雄)
Brian Wong as Liu Shi-hu (劉仕虎)
Tie Meng-chiu as Yu Chi-yung (俞繼榮)

Part IV (Episodes 16–20)
Part IV (狐仙報恩; lit. "Fox Spirit Repays Debt") is adapted from the tale Siao Chui (小翠).

Gallen Lo as Wang Yuan-feng (王元豐)
Grace Yu as Siao Chui (小翠)
Howie Huang as Wang Kuo-ying (王國英)
Chen Hung-lieh as Wang Tai-cheng (王太常)
Sally Chen as Mrs. Wang (王夫人)
Chau Ching as Wang Yu-chi (王玉芝)
Lily Lieu as Yu (虞氏)
Kwan Yi as Liu (劉媒婆)
Kwong Ming-fai as Chi Er (喜兒)
Gary Chan as the Emperor (皇帝)
Lee Lung-kee as Mao Song-nian (毛松年)
Kwan Ching as Yu Hsu (玉虛道長)
Law Suet-ling as Pang Er (胖兒)
Hui Man-chuen as Wang Fei (王非)
Fung So-bor as Madam Wang Chao (王曹氏)
Josephine Lam as Fifth Aunt (五姨太)
Cheng Pak-lun as Yuan Chung (袁忠)
Chan Wing-chun as Chi He (祈和)
Wan Sheung-yin as Empress Dowager (太后)

Part V (Episodes 21–25)
Part V (翁婿鬥法; lit. "Fight of the In-Laws") is adapted from the tale Chang-ting (長亭).

Howie Huang as Shi Da-bu / Fifth Brother (石大璞／五師兄)
Grace Yu as Weng Chang-ting (翁長亭)
Chen Hung-lieh as Old Weng (翁老兒)
Lily Lieu as Mrs. Weng (翁妻)
Lee Lung-kee as a Taoist abbot
Yip Jan-wa as Big Brother (大師兄)
Yip Yung as Second Brother (二師兄)
Suen Dalong as Third Brother (三師兄)
Brian Wong as Fourth Brother (四師兄)
Cheng Zhuan as Sixth Brother (六師兄)
Hsieh Han as Old Mr. Shi (石老爹)
Kwan Yi as Old Mrs. Shi (石老娘)
Wong Siu-lung as Shi Da-kwai (石大珪)
Amy Fan as Shi Siao-ying (石小英)
Wong Chun-kam as Kao Kwai-chi (高桂枝)
Ling Lai-man as Mr. Kao (高員外)
Lau Kwai-fong as Mrs. Kao (高夫人)
Wa Chung-nam as Kao's housekeeper (高管家)
Fung Hiu-man as Weng Hung-ting (翁紅亭)
Chan Pui-shan as Siao Yan (小燕)
Wilson Tsui as Hua Hua Tai Sui (花花太歲)

Part VI (Episodes 26–35)
Part VI (秋月還陽; lit. "Chiu-yue Returns from Death") is adapted from the tale Wu Chiu-yue (伍秋月).

Gallen Lo as Wang Ting (王鼎)
Grace Yu as Wu Chiu-yue (伍秋月)
Chen Hung-lieh as Wang Nai (王鼐)
Josephine Lam as Wang Nai's wife, Liu (柳氏)
Dai Siu-man as Wang Cheng (王誠)
Hui Man-chuen as Wang An (王安)
Amy Fans as Yuan Yuan-yuan (袁圓圓)
Wilson Tsui as Octopus (八爪魚)
Joseph Lee as Magistrate Peng (彭縣令)
Cheng Fan-sang as King Yan
Lau Dan as Chiu-yue's father, Wu Yuan (伍員)
Derek Kok as Big Head Ghost (大頭鬼)
Brian Wong as Three-eyed Ghost (三眼鬼)

Dark Tales II
Dark Tales II (聊齋貳) originally aired on Jade every weekday evening from 9 March to 1 May 1998, and is produced by Lau Sze-yu, consisting of 40 episodes. It features eight independent stories, adapted from the first fifteen books of Pu's novel.

Part I (Episodes 1–5)
Part I (陸判奇談; lit. "Interesting Tales of Judge Lu") is adapted from the tale Judge Lu (陸判).

Evergreen Mak as Chu Er-dan (朱爾旦)
Celine Ma as Madam Chiao (嬌娘)
Angie Cheong as Chang Yun-luo (章雲蘿)
Felix Lok as Judge Lu (陸判)
Marco Lo as Li Chi-chiao (黎子喬)

Part II (Episodes 6–10)
Part II (綠野飛仙; lit. "Flying Immortal in the Wilderness") is adapted from the tale Ying (阿英).

Jackie Lui as Kan Yu (甘鈺)
Noel Leung as Ah Ying (亞英)
May Kwong as Chin Chi-niao (秦吉鳥)
Derek Kok as Lang Wen-hsien (郎文軒)
Elvina Kong as Rouge (胭脂)
Chen Xiaoyun as Lotus Fairy (蓮花仙子)
Chan Chung-kin as Father Hao (郝老爹)
Samuel Yau as Chao Da-shan (趙大山)
Wilson Tsui as Prince Ying (鷹王)
Kwan Ching as Mountain Spirit (山妖)
Suen Kwai-hing as Senior (長老)

Part III (Episodes 11–15)
Part III (鬼母痴兒; lit. "Ghostly Mother, Devoted Son") is adapted from the tale Siang-chun (湘裙).

Derek Kok as Shi Yun-ting (石雲庭)
Louisa So as Siang-chun (湘裙)
Benny Chan as Shi Tian-sheng (石天生)
Joyce Chan as Hsia Sue (夏雪)
Chan Dik-hak as Shi Yun-hsien (石雲軒)
So Yan-chi as Hsien's wife 
Chan On-ying as Mute Chuan (啞娟)

Part IV (Episodes 16–20)
Part IV (陰差陽錯; lit. "Accidental Mistake") is adapted from the tale Wang Lu-lang (王六郎).

Evergreen Mak as Wang Lu-lang (王六郎)
Rain Lau as Hsu Dan-feng (許丹鳳)
Chan Wing-chun as Underworld guardian (鬼差)
Felix Lok as Hsu Ban-hsian (許半仙)

Part V (Episodes 21–25)
Part V (花醉紅塵; lit. "World of Drunk Flowers") is adapted from the tale Madam Hsin Shi-si (辛十四娘).

Patrick Tam as Feng Shao-you (馮少游)
Noel Leung as Madam Hsin Shi-si (辛十四娘)
Dickson Li as King Bee (蜂王)
Melissa Ng as Flower Spirit (花妖)
Chang Wing-Chun as Emperor's Bodyguard

Part VI (Episodes 26–30)
Part VI (隔世追情; lit. "Chasing Love Across Time") is adapted from the tale Chin-se (錦瑟).
Joey Leung as Yang Da-yung (楊大勇)
Louisa So as Sue Chin-se (薛錦瑟)
Dickson Li as Yi Dao Sheng (一道生)
Gordon Liu as Kao Ni (高聻)
Akina Hong as Siao Siang (小香)
Wilson Tsui as Chuang Tie-niu (莊鐵牛)
Chan On-ying as Chiao Lan (嬌蘭)
Celine Ma as Toad Spirit (蛤蟆)
Ng Man-sang as Gecko Spirit (壁虎)
Andy Tai as Monk Huo-yun (火雲僧人)
Helen Ma as Ms. Hsu (徐氏)
Felix Lok as Sue Po-ling (薛柏齡)

Part VII (Episodes 31–35)
Part VII (魅影靈狐; lit. "Phantom Fox Spirit") is adapted from the tale Lian Siang (蓮香).

Benny Chan as Sang Siao (桑曉)
Rain Lau as Lian Siang (蓮香)
Florence Kwok as Li Chiu-rong (李秋蓉)
Joyce Chan as Miao Ah-hsiu (苗阿秀)

Part VIII (Episodes 36–40)
Part VIII (斬妖神劍; lit. "Demon Sword") is adapted from the tale Lady Hua (花姑子).

Jackie Lui as An Chun-yang (安君陽)
Angie Cheong as Lady Hua (花姑子)
Cheng Pak-lun as the Thunder God (雷神)
Lily Liu as Lady Hua's mother
Florence Kwok as Po Ching-ching (白晶晶)
Derek Kok as Chian Chi-liang (錢七兩)

External links
Dark Tales I Unofficial Facebook

TVB dramas
1996 Hong Kong television series debuts
1998 Hong Kong television series endings
Hong Kong television shows
Serial drama television series
Romantic fantasy television series
Television shows based on Strange Stories from a Chinese Studio